Torralba de Arciel is a village under the local government of the municipality of Gómara, in Soria, Spain. The village had 37 inhabitants in 2000.

References

Populated places in the Province of Soria